Lúcia Massis de Gouvêa França Gomes (born 28 January 1962) is a Brazilian professor filiated to the Brazilian Socialist Party. The wife of Márcio França, she served as First Lady of the state of São Paulo and also as president of Fundo Social São Paulo.

Biography
Lúcia França was born in São Paulo, but moved to São Vicente at the age of 10. At the age of 17, she graduated in teaching, influenced by her mother who worked in school in São Vicente until being approved to work in Praia Grande. Married with Márcio França since 1986, they had met when they were teenagers. They have two children: pedagogue Helena and lawyer and state deputy Caio França, besides two grandchildren, Enzo and Laura.

She became First Lady of São Paulo in 6 April 2018 after her husband took office as Governor due to the resignation of then Governor Geraldo Alckmin.

From 1997 to 2004, she served as president of Fundo Social de Solidariedade in the municipality of São Vicente.

In 2022, Gouvêa was announced as running mate of Fernando Haddad in the 2022 state election.

References

External links
 
 
 

|-

1962 births
Living people
People from São Paulo
First ladies of São Paulo (state)
Spouses of Brazilian politicians